"You Win Again" is a song written by Barry, Robin and Maurice Gibb and performed by the Bee Gees. The song was produced by the brothers, Arif Mardin and Brian Tench. It was released as the first single on 7 September 1987 by Warner Records, from their seventeenth studio album E.S.P. (1987). It was also their first single released from the record label. The song marked the start of the group's comeback, becoming a No. 1 hit in many European countries, including topping the UK Singles Chart—their first to do so in over eight years—and making them the first group to score a UK No. 1 hit in each of three decades: the 1960s, 1970s, and 1980s.

As songwriters, the Gibb brothers received the 1987 British Academy's Ivor Novello award for Best Song Musically and Lyrically. In 1988, the band received a Brit Award nomination for Best British Group. In a UK television special on ITV in December 2011, it was voted second (behind "How Deep Is Your Love") on The Nation's Favourite Bee Gees Song.

Reception
Cash Box called it "a melodic soft-pop number guaranteed to see instant attention".

Recording
Barry Gibb wrote the melody while his brother Maurice conceived the drum machine sounds in his garage. On "1000 UK #1 Hits" by Jon Kutner and Spencer Leigh, Robin Gibb said "We absolutely thought that 'You Win Again' was going to be a big hit. It took us a month to cut it and get the right mix."

Maurice Gibb explained "You Win Again" in a May 2001 interview with Mojo:

"When we get together and write, it's not like three individuals ― it's like one person in the room. Usually, we have a book of titles and we just pick one. I loved 'You Win Again' as a title, but we had no idea how it might turn out as a song. It ended up as a big demo in my garage, and I recorded stomps and things. There was just one drum on there. The rest was just sounds. Then, everybody tried to talk us out of the stomps at the start. They didn't want it. 'Take it off. Too loud! Can we have them not on the intro, just when the music starts?' All this stuff, but as soon as you hear that 'jabba-doomba, jabba-doomba' on the radio, you know it's us. It's a signal. So, that's one little secret ― give people an automatic identification of who it is."

Chart performance
"You Win Again" was a number one single in the UK, Ireland, Switzerland, Germany, Austria, Denmark and Norway, and reached the top ten in Italy, the Netherlands, Australia and Sweden. It also topped the Eurochart for four weeks.

"You Win Again" entered the UK Singles Chart at No. 87 in the chart week 19 September. Four weeks later, it reached number one, where it remained for four weeks, thus preventing George Michael's single "Faith" from reaching the top spot. When the single reached number one in the UK in mid-October 1987, it marked the Bee Gees as the first group to score a UK number one hit in each of three decades: the 1960s, 1970s and 1980s. It ranked four in the UK's year-end singles sales chart.

However, the single was far less successful in the US, peaking at No. 75 on Billboard's Hot 100, perhaps down to a lingering association between the Bee Gees and the disco backlash that emerged in 1979, when the group (disco icons at the time) were at the height of their fame. Their next charting single, the 1989 hit "One", did return them to the US top ten. Hoping to capitalize on that success, the song was rereleased as the followup; while it did receive renewed airplay on a number of US radio stations, it did not chart this time.

Formats
"You Win Again" was released commercially on vinyl and cassette. The CD single was not common in the late 1980s, though a 1-track CD single was produced as a promotional-only copy given to radio stations and reviewers in the United States and a 2-track mini CD single was commercially released in Japan. The song also appeared as a bonus track on the American version of One, replacing the song "Wing and a Prayer".

Releases and track listings

Personnel
Personnel are adapted from the album E.S.P.
Barry Gibb – lead vocals and backing vocals, guitars
Robin Gibb – backing vocals
Maurice Gibb – synthesizers and backing vocals
Robbie Kondor – synthesizers
Rhett Lawrence – drum machine

Charts

Weekly charts

Year-end charts

Certifications and sales

See also
List of European number-one hits of 1987
List of number-one hits of 1987 (Germany)
List of number-one singles of 1987 (Ireland)
List of number-one songs in Norway
List of number-one singles of the 1980s (Switzerland)
List of UK Singles Chart number ones of the 1980s

References

1987 songs
1987 singles
Bee Gees songs
European Hot 100 Singles number-one singles
Irish Singles Chart number-one singles
Number-one singles in Austria
Number-one singles in Germany
Number-one singles in Norway
Number-one singles in Switzerland
Song recordings produced by Arif Mardin
Song recordings produced by Barry Gibb
Song recordings produced by Robin Gibb
Song recordings produced by Maurice Gibb
Songs written by Barry Gibb
Songs written by Maurice Gibb
Songs written by Robin Gibb
British synth-pop songs
UK Singles Chart number-one singles
Warner Music Group singles
Warner Records singles